Tapinotorquis is a monotypic genus of North American sheet weavers containing the single species, Tapinotorquis yamaskensis. It was first described by N. Dupérré & P. Paquin in 2007, and has only been found in Canada and the United States.

See also
 List of Linyphiidae species (Q–Z)

References

Linyphiidae
Monotypic Araneomorphae genera
Spiders of North America